4/12 may refer to:
April 12 (month-day date notation)
December 4 (day-month date notation)